The FIBA Under-16 Asian Championship is an under-16 basketball championship in the International Basketball Federation's FIBA Asia zone. The event started in 2009 and is held biennially. The top four teams qualify for the FIBA Under-17 Basketball World Cup.

Summary

Medal table

Participating nations

General statistics
All-time statistics, as of the 2022 FIBA U16 Asian Championship.

Under-17 World Cup record

See also
FIBA Under-18 Asian Championship
FIBA Under-17 Basketball World Cup
FIBA Under-16 Women's Asian Championship

References
FIBA Asia Archive

External links 
 

 
Basketball competitions in Asia between national teams
Asia
Asian youth sports competitions
Asia Under-16 Championship